The Academy of Muses is a 2015 Spanish film directed, written, edited, and lensed by José Luis Guerín blending documentary and comedy elements.

Plot 
The plot follows an ethically dubious Italian professor of literature at the University of Barcelona and the interactions with his female students.

Cast

Production 
The film is a Guerín PC and Los Films de Orfeo production. It was shot with a non-professional cast of actors, featuring dialogue in Catalan, Italian, Spanish, and Sard.

Release 
The film made its world premiere in August 2015 at the 68th Locarno Film Festival. It also screened at the Seville European Film Festival in November 2015. It was theatrically released in Spain on 1 January 2006.

Reception 
Eric Kohn of IndieWire gave the film an 'A' grade, deeming it to be "a fascinating look at the antics of an ethically dubious professor that defies easy categorization".

Pere Vall of Fotogramas rated the film 4 out of 5 stars, praising "the (sheer) amount of things it tells us in its apparent simplicity".

Javier Ocaña of El País considered it to be a "fascinating cinematographic experiment".

Gaspar Zimerman of Clarín rated it as "good" while warning that "patience is required for the film".

Accolades 

|-
| align = "center" | 2015 || 12th Seville European Film Festival || colspan = "2" | Golden Giraldillo ||  || 
|-
| align = "center" rowspan = "2" | 2016 || rowspan = "2" | 2nd Fénix Awards || Best Screenplay || José Luis Guerín ||  || rowspan = "2" | 
|-
| Best Editing || José Luis Guerín || 
|-
| align = "center" | 2018 || 66th Silver Condor Awards || colspan = "2" | Best Ibero-American Film ||  || 
|}

See also 
 List of Spanish films of 2016

Accolades 

Spanish comedy films
Films set in Barcelona
Films directed by José Luis Guerín
2010s Spanish films
2010s Catalan-language films
2010s Italian-language films
2010s Spanish-language films